This page documents all tornadoes confirmed by various weather forecast offices of the National Weather Service in the United States from April 2022. On average, there are 155 confirmed tornadoes in the United States in April. This April was significantly above average with 220 tornadoes.

United States yearly total

April

April 4 event

April 5 event

April 6 event

April 7 event

April 11 event

April 12 event

April 13 event

April 17 event

April 21 event

April 22 event

April 23 event

April 24 event

April 25 event

April 26 event

April 28 event

April 29 event

April 30 event

See also
 Tornadoes of 2022
 List of United States tornadoes from January to March 2022
 List of United States tornadoes from May to June 2022

Notes

References 

2022-related lists
Tornadoes of 2022
Tornadoes
2022 natural disasters in the United States
Tornadoes in the United States